Kalabushana Nethalie Violet Nanayakkara (born 26 December 1936 as නෙතලි නානායක්කාර) [Sinhala]), popularly as Nethalie Nanayakkara, is an actress in Sri Lankan cinema, theater and television. One of the earliest pillars in Sri Lankan television drama industry, Nanayakkara has involved more than 140 serials across a career spanning more than six decades.

Personal life
Nanayakkara was born on 26 December 1936 in Kiribathgoda, Colombo as the fourth of the family. She has one elder brother and two elder sisters, where one sister died at small age. She also has two younger brothers. Her father worked at a private company. She started education from Roman Catholic School, Pamunuvila. She is fluent with English and passed the O/L examination at the age of 13. Then she attended to Gurukula Vidyalaya, Kelaniya and studied from English medium.

After the final exams at school, she joined to a private company under the guidance of his uncle. She worked in that company for two year and then resigned. Then she joined with Fordsroad Accounting Institute in Colombo as an auditor and worked for 30 years. She resigned from the job in 1985 to focus her career through cinema.

She married fellow actor Wally Nanayakkara at the age of 27. They were first met at Dalugama Catholic Church in Kelaniya in 1958. During his tenure at Lake House, Wally was also secretary of the Arts Circle. Wally Nanayakkara died on 11 October 2003 at the age of 64.

The couple has one son - Ravi - and four daughters - Renuka, Shamika and twins Chandika and Indika. Her son Ravi is a doctor in Surgery at General Hospital, Colombo and his wife Sagarika is the director of the Maharagama Cancer Hospital.

Career
Nanayakkara has been worked in Radio Ceylon since 1955 in many radio plays. She was first involved in H. D. Wijedasa's radio production of Vihilu Thahalu. Her maiden radio play was Samudra Devi. She met his future husband during this period, where Wally joined the radio dramas in the 1960s. The couple first acted together in the 1962 radio play Muwan Palessa as "Ukku Banda" and "Binari".

She worked parallel in both drama as well as private company without any obstacle. Then she acted in a television serial directed by Ananda Sirisena. In 2000, she received the SIGNIS Award for the teledrama Asani Wasi.

She has worked as a dubbing artist for numerous international television serials.

Selected television serials
 Adaraneeya Chanchala 
 Adare Ahasa Tharam
 Asani Wasi
 Batti
 Diyaniyo 
 Giridevi
 Haara Kotiya
 Ingammaruwa
 Koombiyo 
 No Parking
 Sakala Guru 1 & 2
 Sakarma

Filmography

References

External links
 මනූ‍ගෙන් නාඩගමක් නැති නාදගමක්
 රීලෝඩ් එකක් නැතිව නෙතලි නානායක්කාර හමු වීමු
 ආල වඩන ගමනකි ඇය යන්නේ
 සරසවිය සම්මාන දිනූ තිදෙනකුගේ එකතුවක්
 පැරැණි ගීත රසික හවුලේ සංවත්සර ප්‍රසංගය 19 දා
 තවත් ඓතිහාසික කථා පුවතක් සිංහල ස්වදේශීය සේවයට

1936 births
Sri Lankan film actresses
Sinhalese actresses
20th-century Sri Lankan actresses
21st-century Sri Lankan actresses
Living people